Banzhaf is a German occupational surname for a maker of vats and drinking vessels.

Notable people with this name include:
John Banzhaf (born 1940), American public interest lawyer, legal activist and law professor
Sofia Banzhaf, Canadian actress and filmmaker

References

German-language surnames
Occupational surnames